Yan Mikhailovich Gudkov (born 5 March 2002) is a Russian football player who plays for FC Tekstilshchik Ivanovo on loan from PFC Krylia Sovetov Samara.

Club career
He made his debut in the Russian Football National League for FC Chertanovo Moscow on 22 August 2020 in a game against FC Neftekhimik Nizhnekamsk.

On 5 February 2022, Gudkov moved to Krylia Sovetov Samara. On 29 July 2022, he was loaned to FC Kuban Krasnodar. On 31 January 2023, Gudkov moved on a new loan to FC Tekstilshchik Ivanovo.

Career statistics

References

External links
 
 Profile by Russian Football National League
 

2002 births
People from Saransk
Sportspeople from Mordovia
Living people
Russian footballers
Association football defenders
FC Chertanovo Moscow players
FC Olimp-Dolgoprudny players
PFC Krylia Sovetov Samara players
FC Urozhay Krasnodar players
FC Tekstilshchik Ivanovo players
Russian First League players
Russian Second League players